Hurrem Sultan (1504 – 15 April 1558), also known as Roxelana, was the chief consort and legal wife of the Ottoman sultan Suleiman the Magnificent. She became one of the most powerful and influential women in Ottoman history as well as a prominent and controversial figure during the era known as the Sultanate of Women.

Born in Ruthenia (then an eastern region of the Kingdom of Poland, now Rohatyn, Ukraine) to a Ruthenian Orthodox priest, she was captured by Crimean Tatars during a slave raid and eventually taken to Istanbul, the Ottoman capital. She entered the Imperial Harem where her name was changed to Hurrem, rose through the ranks and became the favourite of Sultan Suleiman. Breaking Ottoman tradition, he married Hurrem, making her his legal wife. Sultans had previously married only foreign free noble ladies. She was the first imperial consort to receive the title Haseki Sultan. Hurrem remained in the sultan's court for the rest of her life, enjoying a close relationship with her husband, and having six children with him, including the future sultan, Selim II.

Hurrem eventually achieved power, influencing the politics of the Ottoman Empire. Through her husband, she played an active role in affairs of the state. She probably acted as the sultan's advisor, wrote diplomatic letters to King Sigismund II Augustus of Poland and patronized major public works (including the Haseki Sultan Complex and the Hurrem Sultan Bathhouse). She died in 1558, in Istanbul and was buried in a mausoleum within the Süleymaniye Mosque complex.

Names
Her birth name is unknown. Leslie P. Peirce has written that it may have been either Anastasia, or Aleksandra Lisowska. Among the Ottomans, she was known mainly as Haseki Hurrem Sultan or Hurrem Haseki Sultan. Hurrem or Khorram means "the joyful one" in Persian. The name Roxalane derives from Roksolanes, which was the generic term used by the Ottomans to describe girls from Podolia and Galicia who were taken in slave raids.

Origin
Sources indicate that Roxelana was originally from Ruthenia, which was then part of the Polish Crown. According to late 16th-century and early 17th-century sources, such as the Polish poet Samuel Twardowski (died 1661), who researched the subject in Turkey, Roxelana was seemingly born to a man surnamed Lisovski, who was an Orthodox priest of Ruthenian origin. Her native language was Ruthenian, the precursor to modern Ukrainian.

During the reign of Selim I, which means some time between 1512 and 1520, Crimean Tatars kidnapped her during one of their Crimean–Nogai slave raids in Eastern Europe. The Tatars may have first taken her to the Crimean city of Kaffa, a major centre of the Ottoman slave trade, before she was taken to Istanbul. In Istanbul, Valide Hafsa Sultan selected Roxelana as a gift for her son, Suleiman. Roxelana later managed to become the first Haseki Sultan or "favorite concubine" of the Ottoman imperial harem. Michalo Lituanus wrote in the 16th century that "the most beloved wife of the present Turkish emperor – mother of his first [son] who will govern after him, was kidnapped from our land".

Shaykh Qutb al-Din al-Nahrawali, a Meccan religious figure, who visited Istanbul in late 1557, noted in his memoirs that Hurrem Sultan was of Ruthenian origin. She had been a servant in the household of Hançerli Zeynep Fatma Sultan, daughter of Şehzade Mahmud, son of Sultan Bayezid II.

European ambassadors of that period called her la Rossa, la Rosa, and Roxelana, meaning "the Russian woman" or "the Ruthenian one" for her alleged Ruthenian origins. She is the sultan's consort with the most portraits in her name in the Ottoman Empire, though the portraits are imaginary depictions by painters.

Relationship with Suleiman

Roxelana, called Hurrem Sultan by the Ottomans, probably entered the harem around seventeen years of age. The precise year that she entered the harem is unknown, but scholars believe that she became Suleiman's concubine around the time he became sultan in 1520.

Roxelana's unprecedented rise from harem slave to Suleiman's legal wife and Ottoman Empress attracted jealousy and disfavor not only from her rivals in the harem, but also from the general populace. She soon became Suleiman's most prominent consort beside Mahidevran (also known as Gülbahar), and their relationship was monogamous. While the exact dates for the births of her children are disputed, there is academic consensus that the births of her five children —Şehzade Mehmed, Mihrimah Sultan, Şehzade Abdullah, Sultan Selim II and Şehzade Bayezid — occurred quickly over the next four to five years. Suleiman and Roxelana's last child, Şehzade Cihangir was born with a hunchback, but by that time Roxelana had given birth to enough healthy sons to secure the future of the Ottoman dynasty.

Her joyful spirit and playful temperament earned her a new name, Hurrem, from Persian Khorram, "the cheerful one". In the Istanbul harem, Hurrem became a rival to Mahidevran and her influence over the sultan soon became legendary.
Hurrem was allowed to give birth to more than one son which was a stark violation of the old imperial harem principle, "one concubine mother — one son," which was designed to prevent both the mother's influence over the sultan and the feuds of the blood brothers for the throne. She was to bear the majority of Suleiman's children. Hurrem gave birth to her first son Mehmed in 1521 (who died in 1543) and then to four more sons, destroying Mahidevran's status as the mother of the sultan's only son. 

Suleiman's mother, Hafsa Sultan, partially suppressed the rivalry between the two women. According to Bernardo Navagero's report, as a result of the bitter rivalry a fight between the two women broke out, with Mahidevran beating Hurrem, which angered Suleiman. According to Necdet Sakaoğlu, a Turkish historian, these accusations were not truthful. After the death of Suleiman's mother Hafsa Sultan in 1534, Hurrem's influence in the palace increased, and she took over the ruling of the Harem. Hurrem became the only partner of the ruler and received the title of Haseki, which means the favorite. When Suleiman freed and married her, she became the Haseki Sultan (adding the word sultan to a woman's name or title indicated that she was a part of the dynasty).

Around 1526/1534 (the exact date is unknown), Suleiman married Hurrem in a magnificent formal ceremony. Never before had a former slave been elevated to the status of the sultan's lawful spouse, a development which astonished observers in the palace and in the city. It was only possible for Hurrem to marry Suleiman after the death of Hafsa Sultan. It was not because Hafsa Sultan was firmly against this unification, but because it was not allowed for a concubine to rise above the status of the Valide Sultan (Queen Mother). 

Hurrem became the first consort to receive the title Haseki Sultan. This title, used for a century, reflected the great power of imperial consorts (most of them were former slaves) in the Ottoman court, elevating their status higher than Ottoman princesses, and making them the equals of empresses consort in Europe. In this case, Suleiman not only broke the old custom, but began a new tradition for the future Ottoman sultans: To marry in a formal ceremony and to give their consorts significant influence on the court, especially in matters of succession. Hurrem's salary was 2,000 aspers a day, making her one of the highest-paid Hasekis. After the wedding, the idea circulated that the sultan had limited his autonomy and was dominated and controlled by his wife. Also, in Ottoman society, mothers played more influential roles in their sons' educations and in guiding their careers.

After the death of Suleiman's mother, Hafsa Sultan, in 1534, Hurrem became the most trusted news source of Suleiman. In one of her letters to Suleiman, she informs him about the situation of the plague in the capital. She wrote, "My dearest Sultan! If you ask about Istanbul, the city still suffers from the plague; however, it is not like the previous one. God willing, it will go away as soon as you return to the city. Our ancestors said that the plague goes away once the trees shed their leaves in autumn."

Later, Hurrem became the first woman to remain in the sultan's court for the duration of her life. In the Ottoman imperial family tradition, a sultan's consort was to remain in the harem only until her son came of age (around 16 or 17), after which he would be sent away from the capital to govern a faraway province, and his mother would follow him. This tradition was called Sancak Beyliği. The consorts were never to return to Istanbul unless their sons succeeded to the throne. In defiance of this age-old custom, Hurrem stayed behind in the harem, even after her sons went to govern the empire's remote provinces.

Moreover, remaining in Istanbul, she moved out of the harem located in the Old Palace (Eski Saray) and permanently moved into the Topkapı Palace after a fire destroyed the old harem. Some sources say she moved to Topkapı, not because of the fire, but as a result of her marriage to Suleiman. Either way, this was another significant break from established customs, as Sultan Mehmed the Conqueror had specifically issued a decree to the effect that no women would be allowed to reside in the same building where government affairs were conducted. After Hurrem resided at Topkapı it became known as the New Palace (saray-ı jedid).

She wrote many love letters to Suleiman when he was away for campaigns. In one of her letters, she wrote:

"After I put my head on the ground and kiss the soil that your blessed feet step upon, my nation's sun and wealth my sultan, if you ask about me, your servant who has caught fire from the zeal of missing you, I am like the one whose liver (in this case, meaning heart) has been broiled; whose chest has been ruined; whose eyes are filled with tears, who cannot distinguish anymore between night and day; who has fallen into the sea of yearning; desperate, mad with your love; in a worse situation than Ferhat and Majnun, this passionate love of yours, your slave, is burning because I have been separated from you. Like a nightingale, whose sighs and cries for help do not cease, I am in such a state due to being away from you. I would pray to Allah to not afflict this pain even upon your enemies. My dearest sultan! As it has been one-and-a-half months since I last heard from you, Allah knows that I have been crying night and day waiting for you to come back home. While I was crying without knowing what to do, the one and only Allah allowed me to receive good news from you. Once I heard the news, Allah knows, I came to life once more since I had died while waiting for you.

Under his pen name, Muhibbi, Sultan Suleiman composed this poem for Hurrem Sultan:

"Throne of my lonely niche, my wealth, my love, my moonlight.
My most sincere friend, my confidant, my very existence, my Sultan, my one and only love.
The most beautiful among the beautiful...
My springtime, my merry faced love, my daytime, my sweetheart, laughing leaf...
My plants, my sweet, my rose, the one only who does not distress me in this world...
My Istanbul, my Caraman, the earth of my Anatolia
My Badakhshan, my Baghdad and Khorasan
My woman of the beautiful hair, my love of the slanted brow, my love of eyes full of mischief...
I'll sing your praises always
I, lover of the tormented heart, Muhibbi of the eyes full of tears, I am happy."

State affairs
Hurrem Sultan is known as the first woman in Ottoman history to concern herself with state affairs. Thanks to her intelligence, she acted as Suleiman's chief adviser on matters of state, and seems to have had an influence upon foreign policy and international politics. She frequently accompanied him as a political adviser. She imprinted her seal and watched the council meetings through a wire mesh window. With many other revolutionary movements like these, she had started an era in Ottoman Empire called the Reign of Women. Hurrem's influence on Suleiman was so significant that rumors circulated around the Ottoman court that the sultan had been bewitched.

Her influence with Suleiman made her one of the most powerful women in Ottoman history and in the world at that time. Even as a consort, her power was comparable with the most powerful woman of the Imperial Harem, who by tradition was the sultan's mother or valide sultan. For this reason, she has become a controversial figure in Ottoman history — subject to allegations of plotting against and manipulating her political rivals.

Controversial figure

Hurrem's influence in state affairs not only made her one of the most influential women, but also a controversial figure in Ottoman history, especially in her rivalry with Mahidevran and her son Şehzade Mustafa, and the grand viziers Pargalı Ibrahim Pasha and Kara Ahmed Pasha.

Hurrem and Mahidevran had given birth to Suleiman's six şehzades (Ottoman princes), four of whom survived past the 1550s: Mehmed, Selim, Bayezid, and Cihangir. Of these, Mahidevran's son Mustafa was the eldest and preceded Hurrem's children in the order of succession. Traditionally, when a new sultan rose to power, he would order all of his brothers killed in order to ensure there was no power struggle. This practice was called kardeş katliamı, literally "fraternal massacring".

Mustafa was supported by Ibrahim Pasha, who became Suleiman's grand vizier in 1523. Hurrem has usually been held at least partly responsible for the intrigues in nominating a successor. Although she was Suleiman's wife, she exercised no official public role. This did not, however, prevent Hurrem from wielding powerful political influence. Since the empire lacked, until the reign of Ahmed I (1603–1617), any formal means of nominating a successor, successions usually involved the death of competing princes in order to avert civil unrest and rebellions. In attempting to avoid the execution of her sons, Hurrem used her influence to eliminate those who supported Mustafa's accession to the throne.

A skilled commander of Suleiman's army, Ibrahim eventually fell from grace after an imprudence committed during a campaign against the Persian Safavid empire during the Ottoman–Safavid War (1532–55), when he awarded himself a title including the word "Sultan". Another conflict occurred when Ibrahim and his former mentor, İskender Çelebi, repeatedly clashed over military leadership and positions during the Safavid war. These incidents launched a series of events which culminated in his execution in 1536 by Suleiman's order. It is believed that Hurrem's influence contributed to Suleiman's decision. After three other grand viziers in eight years, Suleiman selected Hurrem's son-in-law, Damat Rüstem Pasha, husband of Mihrimah, to become the grand vizier. Scholars have wondered if Hurrem's alliance with Mihrimah Sultan and Rüstem Pasha helped secure the throne for one of Hurrem's sons.

Many years later, towards the end of Suleiman's long reign, the rivalry between his sons became evident. Mustafa was later accused of causing unrest. During the campaign against Safavid Persia in 1553, because of fear of rebellion, Suleiman ordered the execution of Mustafa. According to a source he was executed that very year on charges of planning to dethrone his father; his guilt for the treason of which he was accused remains neither proven nor disproven. It is also rumored that Hurrem Sultan conspired against Mustafa with the help of her daughter and son-in-law Rustem Pasha; they wanted to portray Mustafa as a traitor who secretly contacted the Shah of Iran. Acting on Hurrem Sultan's orders, Rustem Pasha had engraved Mustafa's seal and sent a letter seemingly written from his mouth to Shah Tahmasb I, and then sent Shah's response to Suleiman. After the death of Mustafa, Mahidevran lost her status in the palace as the mother of the heir apparent and moved to Bursa. She did not spend her last years in poverty, as Hurrem's son, Selim II, the new sultan after 1566, put her on a lavish salary. Her rehabilitation had been possible after the death of Hurrem in 1558. Cihangir, Hurrem's youngest child, allegedly died of grief a few months after the news of his half-brother's murder.

Although the stories about Hurrem's role in executions of Ibrahim, Mustafa, and Kara Ahmed are very popular, actually none of them are based on first-hand sources. All other depictions of Hurrem, starting with comments by sixteenth and seventeenth-century Ottoman historians as well as by European diplomats, observers, and travellers, are highly derivative and speculative in nature. Because none of these people – neither Ottomans nor foreign visitors – were permitted into the inner circle of the imperial harem, which was surrounded by multiple walls, they largely relied on the testimony of the servants or courtiers or on the popular gossip circulating around Istanbul.

Even the reports of the Venetian ambassadors (baili) at Suleiman's court, the most extensive and objective first-hand Western source on Hurrem to date, were often filled with the authors’ own interpretations of the harem rumours. Most other sixteenth-century Western sources on Hurrem, which are considered highly authoritative today — such as Turcicae epistolae (English: The Turkish Letters) of Ogier de Busbecq, the Emissary of the Holy Roman Emperor Ferdinand I at the Porte between 1554 and 1562; the account of the murder of Şehzade Mustafa by Nicholas de Moffan; the historical chronicles on Turkey by Paolo Giovio; and the travel narrative by Luidgi Bassano — derived from hearsay.

Foreign policy

Hurrem acted as Suleiman's advisor on matters of state, and seems to have had an influence upon foreign policy and on international politics. Two of her letters to King Sigismund II Augustus of Poland (reigned 1548–1572) have survived, and during her lifetime the Ottoman Empire generally had peaceful relations with the Polish state within a Polish–Ottoman alliance.

In her first short letter to Sigismund II, Hurrem expresses her highest joy and congratulations to the new king on the occasion of his ascension to the Polish throne after the death of his father Sigismund I the Old in 1548. There was a seal on the back of the letter. For the first and only time in the Ottoman Empire, a female sultan exchanged letters with a king. After that, although Hurrem's successor Nurbanu Sultan and her successor Safiye Sultan exchanged letters with queens, there is no other example of a female sultan who personally contacted a king other than Hurrem Sultan. She pleads with the King to trust her envoy Hassan Ağa who took another message from her by word of mouth. 

In her second letter to Sigismund Augustus, written in response to his letter, Hurrem expresses in superlative terms her joy at hearing that the king is in good health and that he sends assurances of his sincere friendliness and attachment towards Sultan Suleiman the Magnificent. She quotes the sultan as saying, "with the old king we were like brothers, and if it pleases the All-Merciful God, with this king we will be as father and son." With this letter, Hurrem sent Sigismund II the gift of two pairs of linen shirts and pants, some belts, six handkerchiefs, and a hand-towel, with a promise to send a special linen robe in the future.

There are reasons to believe that these two letters were more than just diplomatic gestures, and that Suleiman's references to brotherly or fatherly feelings were not a mere tribute to political expediency. The letters also suggest Hurrem's strong desire to establish personal contact with the king. In his 1551 letter to Sigismund II concerning the embassy of Piotr Opaliński, Suleiman wrote that the Ambassador had seen "Your sister and my wife." Whether this phrase refers to a warm friendship between the Polish King and Ottoman Haseki, or whether it suggests a closer relation, the degree of their intimacy definitely points to a special link between the two states at the time.

Charities

Aside from her political concerns, Hurrem engaged in several major works of public buildings, from Makkah to Jerusalem (Al-Quds), perhaps modelling her charitable foundations in part after the caliph Harun al-Rashid's consort Zubaida. Among her first foundations were a mosque, two Quranic schools (madrassa), a fountain, and a women's hospital near the women's slave market (Avret Pazary) in Istanbul (Haseki Sultan Complex). It was the first complex constructed in Istanbul by Mimar Sinan in his new position as the chief imperial architect.

She built mosque complexes in Adrianopole and Ankara. She commissioned a bath, the Hurrem Sultan Bathhouse, to serve the community of worshippers in the nearby Hagia Sophia. In Jerusalem she established the Haseki Sultan Imaret in 1552, a public soup kitchen to feed the poor, which was said to have fed at least 500 people twice a day. She built a public soup kitchen in Makkah.

She had a Kira who acted as her secretary and intermediary on several occasions, although the identity of the kira is uncertain (it may have been Strongilah or Esther Handali).

Death

Hurrem died on 15 April 1558 due to an unknown illness and was buried in a domed mausoleum (türbe) decorated in exquisite Iznik tiles depicting the garden of paradise, perhaps in homage to her smiling and joyful nature. Her mausoleum is adjacent to Suleiman's, a separate and more somber domed structure, at the courtyard of the Süleymaniye Mosque.

Personality
Roxelana's contemporaries describe her as a woman who was strikingly good-looking, and different from everybody else because of her red hair. Roxelana was also intelligent and had a pleasant personality. Her love of poetry is considered one of the reasons behind her being heavily favoured by Suleiman, who was a great admirer of poetry.

Roxelana is known to have been very generous to the poor. She built numerous mosques, madrasahs, hammams, and resting places for pilgrims travelling to the Islamic holy city of Makkah. Her greatest philanthropical work was the Great Waqf of AlQuds, a large soup kitchen in Jerusalem that fed the poor.

It is believed that Roxelana was a cunning, manipulative and stony-hearted woman who would execute anyone who stood in her way. However, her philanthropy is in contrast to this as she cared for the poor. Prominent Ukrainian writer Pavlo Zahrebelny describes Roxelana as "an intelligent, kind, understanding, openhearted, candid, talented, generous, emotional and grateful woman who cares about the soul rather than the body; who is not carried away with ordinary glimmers such as money, prone to science and art; in short, a perfect woman."

Legacy 
Roxelana, or Hurrem Haseki Sultan, is well-known both in modern Turkey and in the West, and is the subject of many artistic works. In 1561, three years after her death, the French author Gabriel Bounin wrote a tragedy titled La Soltane. This tragedy marks the first time the Ottomans were introduced on stage in France. She has inspired paintings, musical works (including Joseph Haydn's Symphony No. 63), an opera by Denys Sichynsky, a ballet, plays, and several novels written mainly in Russian and Ukrainian, but also in English, French, German and Polish.

In early modern Spain, she appears or is alluded to in works by Quevedo and other writers as well as in a number of plays by Lope de Vega. In a play entitled The Holy League, Titian appears on stage at the Venetian Senate, and stating that he has just come from visiting the Sultan, displays his painting of Sultana Rossa or Roxelana.

In 2007, Muslims in Mariupol, a port city in Ukraine opened a mosque to honour Roxelana.

In the 2003 TV miniseries, Hürrem Sultan, she was played by Turkish actress and singer Gülben Ergen. In the 2011–2014 TV series Muhteşem Yüzyıl, Hurrem Sultan is portrayed by Turkish-German actress Meryem Uzerli from seasons one to three. For the series' last season, she is portrayed by Turkish actress Vahide Perçin.

In 2019, mention of the Russian origin of Roxelana was removed from the visitor panel near her tomb at the Süleymaniye Mosque in Istanbul at the request of the Ukrainian Embassy in Turkey.

Visual tradition 

Despite the fact that male European artists were denied access to Roxelana in the Harem, there are many Renaissance paintings of the famous sultana. Scholars thus agree that European artists created a visual identity for Ottoman women that was largely imagined. Artists Titian, Melchior Lorich, and Sebald Beham were all influential in creating a visual representation of Roxelana. Images of the chief consort emphasized her beauty and wealth, and she is almost always depicted with elaborate headwear.

The Venetian painter Titian is reputed to have painted Roxelana in 1550. Although he never visited Istanbul, he either imagined her appearance or had a sketch of her. In a letter to Philip II of Spain, the painter claims to have sent him a copy of this "Queen of Persia" in 1552. The Ringling Museum in Sarasota, Florida, purchased the original or a copy around 1930. Titian's painting of Roxelana is very similar to his portrait of her daughter, Mihrimah Sultan.

Children

With Suleiman, she had five sons and one daughter.
 Şehzade Mehmed  (1521, Topkapı Palace, Istanbul – 7 November 1543, Manisa Palace, Manisa, buried in Şehzade Mosque, Istanbul): Hurrem's first son. Mehmed became the ruler of Manisa from 1541 until his death.
 Mihrimah Sultan (1522, Topkapı Palace, Istanbul – 25 January 1578, buried in Suleiman I Mausoleum, Süleymaniye Mosque): Hurrem's only daughter. She was married to Rüstem Pasha, later Ottoman Grand Vizier, on 26 November 1539.
 Selim II (28 May 1524, Topkapı Palace, Istanbul – 15 December 1574, Topkapı Palace, Istanbul, buried in Selim II Mausoleum, Hagia Sophia Mosque): He was governor of Manisa after Mehmed's death and later governor of Konya. He ascended to the throne on 7 September 1566 as Selim II.
 Şehzade Abdullah (1525, Topkapı Palace, Istanbul – c. 1528, Topkapı Palace, Istanbul, buried in Yavuz Selim Mosque)
 Şehzade Bayezid (1527, Topkapı Palace, Istanbul – killed on 25 September 1561, Qazvin, Safavid Empire, buried in Melik-i Acem Türbe, Sivas): He was governor of Kütahya and later Amasya.
 Şehzade Cihangir (9 December 1531, Topkapı Palace, Istanbul – 27 November 1553, Aleppo, buried in Şehzade Mosque, Istanbul)

Gallery

See also
Ottoman dynasty
Ottoman family tree
List of mothers of the Ottoman sultans
List of consorts of the Ottoman sultans
Haseki Sultan Complex, Fatih, Istanbul
Hagia Sophia Hurrem Sultan Bathhouse, Fatih, Istanbul
Haseki Sultan Imaret, Jerusalem
Suleiman the Magnificent
Sultanate of Women

Notes

References

Further reading
.
Peirce, Leslie P. The Imperial Harem: Women and Sovereignty in the Ottoman Empire (Oxford University Press, 1993)
There are many historical novels in English about Roxelana: P.J. Parker's Roxelana and Suleyman (2012; Revised 2016); Barbara Chase Riboud's Valide (1986); Alum Bati's Harem Secrets (2008); Colin Falconer, Aileen Crawley (1981–83), and Louis Gardel (2003); Pawn in Frankincense, the fourth book of the Lymond Chronicles by Dorothy Dunnett; and pulp fiction author Robert E. Howard in The Shadow of the Vulture imagined Roxelana to be sister to its fiery-tempered female protagonist, Red Sonya.
 David Chataignier, "Roxelane on the French Tragic Stage (1561-1681)" in Fortune and Fatality: Performing the Tragic in Early Modern France, ed. Desmond Hosford and Charles Wrightington (Newcastle upon Tyne: Cambridge Scholars Publishing, 2008), 95–117.
 Parker, P. J. Roxelana and Suleyman (Raider Publishing International, 2011).
 Thomas M. Prymak, "Roxolana: Wife of Suleiman the Magnificent," Nashe zhyttia/Our Life, LII, 10 (New York, 1995), 15–20. An illustrated popular-style article in English with a bibliography.
 Galina Yermolenko, "Roxolana: The Greatest Empresse of the East," The Muslim World, 95, 2 (2005), 231–48. Makes good use of European, especially Italian, sources and is familiar with the literature in Ukrainian and Polish.
 Galina Yermolenko (ed.), Roxolana in European Literature, History and Culture (Farmham, UK: Ashgate, 2010).  318 pp. Illustrated. Contains important articles by Oleksander Halenko and others, as well as several translations of works about Roxelana from various European literatures, and an extensive bibliography.
 For Ukrainian language novels, see Osyp Nazaruk (1930) (English translation is available), Mykola Lazorsky (1965), Serhii Plachynda (1968), and Pavlo Zahrebelnyi (1980).
 There have been novels written in other languages: in French, a fictionalized biography by Willy Sperco (1972); in German, a novel by Johannes Tralow (1944, reprinted many times); a very detailed novel in Serbo-Croatian by Radovan Samardzic (1987); one in Turkish by Ulku Cahit (2001).

References

External links

University of Calgary | Roxelana
Hürrem Sultan's tomb

1500s births
1558 deaths
16th-century consorts of Ottoman sultans
Ruthenian people
Converts to Islam from Eastern Orthodoxy
People from Ruthenian Voivodeship
People from Rohatyn
Ukrainian Muslims
Former Ukrainian Orthodox Christians
Suleiman the Magnificent
Ottoman former Christians
Mothers of Ottoman sultans